James Gerard Devlin (8 October 1907 – 17 October 1991) was a Northern Irish actor who made his stage debut in 1931, and had long association with the Ulster Group Theatre. In a career spanning nearly sixty years, he played parts in TV productions such as Z-Cars, Dad's Army, The New Avengers and Bread. He also guest starred, alongside Leonard Rossiter, in an episode of Steptoe and Son, "The Desperate Hours".  The writers of Steptoe and Son - Ray Galton and Alan Simpson - later said Devlin was second choice to play the part of Albert Steptoe in the series, behind Wilfrid Brambell.  He also appeared as Father Dooley, a Catholic priest, in several episodes of Carla Lane's Bread, his last television appearance.

In 1969, he was in the Abbey Theatre production of Macook's Corner. where he played the part of Neal Macook.

In 1956, he appeared in a play by Irish playwright Teresa Deevy "Light Falling" where he played the part of Pat Scully, this was produced by Jack MacGowran in the Lyric Theatre (Hammersmith) as an 'opener' for Seán O'Casey play "The Shadow of a Gunman"

In 1978, he had a small part in the Thames Television / Euston Films Drama The Sweeney (Season 4 Episode 5, 'Nightmare'), playing 'Haig' a handyman in an antique dealers yard. The yard owner was a former IRA operative.

He was Vivian Stanshall's personal choice for the role of Old Scrotum, the Wrinkled Retainer in the Charisma Films version of Sir Henry at Rawlinson End, released in 1980.

Early life

Devlin was born at 35 Waterville Street, Belfast, the eldest child of labourer Edward Devlin and Isabella Hamill. He had three younger sisters, Rose, Kathleen and Isabella.

Filmography

Playography 

 Pat Scully in Light Falling (1956)
 Neal Macook in Macook's Corner 1969 (Abbey)

References

External links
 
 J.G.Devlin at the Teresa Deevy Archive
 J.G.Devlin at the Abbey Theatre Archive

Male television actors from Northern Ireland
1907 births
1991 deaths
Male actors from Belfast
20th-century male actors from Northern Ireland